Jair da Costa (born 9 July 1940), known simply as Jair, is a former Brazilian footballer who played as a right winger.

Club career
Jair da Costa started his club career with Portuguesa as a youth, making his senior debut against XV Novembro de Jaú. Whilst with Portugesa he helped them to the runners-up spot in the 1960 Campeonato Paulista.

Jair da Costa moved to Italian side Internazionale in November 1962, and went on to play a total of 260 senior games for the Milan club in two spells (1962–1967 and 1968–1972). He was notably a key member of Helenio Herrera's Grande Inter squad on the right wing, and won four Serie A titles (two of which were won consecutively), and two European Cups in 1964 and 1965, as well as consecutive Intercontinental Cups in 1964 and 1965, during his time at the club. He was not only the first Brazilian player to win multiple European Cups, but also the first Brazilian player to win multiple Intercontinental Cups with a European team.

In between his two spells with Inter, Jair da Costa also spent the 1967–68 season with A.S. Roma. Following his time in Italy, he later returned to Brazil in 1972 and played for Santos FC until 1974, winning the Campeonato Paulista in 1973. He ended his career in Canada's National Soccer League in 1975, with Windsor Star.

International career
At international level, Jair da Costa only obtained one cap for the Brazil national football team, due to the presence of Garrincha in his position; his only appearance came in a 3–1 friendly win over Wales in São Paulo, on 16 May 1962. He was also a non-playing member of the Brazilian team that won the 1962 FIFA World Cup.

Style of play
An extremely fast and agile winger, with quick feet and good technique, Jair da Costa was also known for his powerful striking ability and his great pace on the ball; due to these abilities, he was also capable of functioning as a striker. He was also known for his dribbling skills and use of elaborate feints.

Honours

Club
Inter
 Serie A: 1962–63, 1964–65, 1965–66, 1970–71
 European Cup: 1963–64, 1964–65
 Intercontinental Cup: 1964, 1965

Santos
 Campeonato Paulista: 1973

International
Brazil
 FIFA World Cup: 1962

References

1940 births
Living people
Brazilian footballers
Brazil international footballers
1962 FIFA World Cup players
FIFA World Cup-winning players
Brazilian expatriate footballers
Brazilian expatriate sportspeople in Italy
Expatriate footballers in Italy
Serie A players
Inter Milan players
A.S. Roma players
Associação Portuguesa de Desportos players
Santos FC players
Association football midfielders
UEFA Champions League winning players
Canadian National Soccer League players
People from Santo André, São Paulo
Footballers from São Paulo (state)